Ozerki is a rural locality (a selo) in Starooskolsky District, Belgorod Oblast, Russia. The population was 774 as of 2010. There are 53 streets.

Geography 
Ozerki is located 17 km southeast of Stary Oskol (the district's administrative centre) by road. Chernikovo is the nearest rural locality.

References 

Rural localities in Starooskolsky District